Pachyplichas is a genus containing two extinct species of New Zealand wren, a family of small birds endemic to New Zealand.

Species
 †P. yaldwyni (South Island stout-legged wren) – South Island, New Zealand
 †P. jagmi (North Island stout-legged wren) – North Island, New Zealand

Description
The stout-legged wrens formed a species pair.  They had reduced wings and robust legs indicating that they were adapted to a terrestrial existence and were either flightless or nearly so. Genetic evidence has indicated that Pachyplichas is nested within Xenicus, and stout legged wrens must have evolved from a gracile legged ancestor. A cladogram is given below.

References

Notes

Sources
 

 
Extinct birds of New Zealand
Holocene extinctions
Fossil taxa described in 1988
Bird genera
Late Quaternary prehistoric birds